The Journal of Gene Medicine is a monthly peer-reviewed medical journal covering gene therapy and other uses of genetic technologies for medical purposes. It was established in 1999 and is published by John Wiley & Sons. The editors-in-chief is Gening Jiang (Tongji University). According to the Journal Citation Reports, the journal has a 2020 impact factor of 4.565, ranking it 43rd out of 160 journals in the category "Biotechnology & Applied Microbiology".

References

External links

Gene therapy
Medical genetics journals
English-language journals
Wiley (publisher) academic journals
Monthly journals
Publications established in 1999
Biotechnology journals